Cobham is a large village in the Borough of Elmbridge in Surrey, England, centred  south-west of London and  northeast of Guildford on the River Mole.  It has a commercial/services High Street, a significant number of primary and private schools and the Painshill landscape park.

Toponymy
Cobham appears in Domesday Book of 1086 as Covenham and in 13th century copies of earlier charters as Coveham. It is recorded as Cobbeham and Cobeham in the 15th century and the first use of the modern spelling "Cobham" is from 1570. The name is thought to derive from an Anglo-Saxon landowner either as Cofa's hām or Cofa's hamm. The second part of the name may have originated from the Old English hām meaning a settlement or enclosure, or from hamm meaning land close to water.

The area of the village known as Cobham Tilt, is first recorded as la Tilthe in 1328. The name is thought to derive from the Old English Tilthe, meaning "cultivated land".

History

Cobham is an ancient settlement whose origins can be traced back on the ground through Roman times to the Iron Age. It lay within the Elmbridge hundred.

Cobham appears in Domesday Book as Covenham and was held by Chertsey Abbey. Its Domesday assets were: 12½ hides; 3 mills worth 13s 4d, 10 ploughs, 1 alike unit of meadow, woodland worth 40 hogs. It rendered altogether £14 per year to its feudal system overlords.

Historically, Cobham other than outlying farms comprised two developed areas, Street Cobham and Church Cobham.  The former lay on the Portsmouth-London Road, and the building now known as the Cobham Exchange was once a coaching inn.  The latter grew up around St Andrew's Church, which dates from the 12th century.  Although much altered and extended in the 19th century, the church preserves a Norman tower and is a Grade I listed building (the highest architectural category).

The village's population was reported as 1617 inhabitants in 1848. The arrival of the railway in the 1880s led to the expansion of the original village, the eastern fields and southern areas towards the railway station becoming suburbanised during the 20th century.  A 1960s improvements scheme widened the entrance to the High Street from River Hill to the south which was very narrow, removing a few historic and picturesque buildings, replacing some with less ornate brickwork glass-fronted buildings suitable as shops.  Subsequently, the High Street has developed into a local shopping centre.

Aviation and motor industries

Leading motor engineer and car designers Reid Railton and Noel Macklin set up a manufacturing facility, building Railton road cars at the Fairmile Works from 1933 to 1940. An example is displayed at Brooklands Museum in the same borough.

In World War II, after a major aircraft factory, Vickers-Armstrongs, at Brooklands was bombed by the Luftwaffe on 4 September 1940, with heavy loss of life and many more injured, the Vickers Experimental Department was quickly dispersed to secret premises on the Silvermere and Foxwarren Park estates along Redhill Road. Engineer and inventor Barnes Wallis also carried out important trials catapulting models of his 'Upkeep' bouncing bomb across Silvermere Lake around 1942 and conducted spinning trials with larger prototypes at 'Depot W46' (the largest of the three dispersed sites). Vickers had numerous other wartime dispersed depots locally and those within the boundaries or whose nearest village was Cobham included Corbie Wood and Riseholme (on Seven Hills Road), Conway Cottage and Norwood Farm.

Despite its proximity to Brooklands and Wisley airfields (both active until the early 1970s), Cobham saw relatively few aircraft crashes. Most notable was a Lockheed P-38 Lightning fighter which flew low over Brooklands apparently in trouble and crashed at Cobham on 16 March 1944; the pilot survived and little else was published of this incident.

During World War II aircraft company Airspeed Ltd set up a design office at Fairmile Manor which designed the civil aircraft the Airspeed Ambassador before moving back to Portsmouth in the late 1940s.

After the war, Vickers' Experimental Department continued to use two of the Redhill Road sites (now known as 'Foxwarren') and built aircraft prototypes there such as the Viscount airliner and Valiant V-bomber, until it moved back to the main factory at Brooklands in the late 1950s.

In the 1970s residents Mike Chambers ran a business building Huron Formula Fords and a Formula Atlantic car at the Silvermere works and Geoff Uren prepared the BMW team saloon cars and Graham Hill's Jägermeister-sponsored Formula 2 car.

From 1972 to 2011 Cobham Bus Museum occupied an ex-aircraft hangar (used mainly by Vickers-Armstrongs as a machine shop) next to Silvermere golf course in Redhill Road. The bus museum reopened as the London bus museum at Brooklands Museum on 1 August 2011. The former premises have been replaced by a care home.

Geography

Boundaries
Cobham fits into a triangle between the River Mole to the south, the A3 to the north and a borderline for the most part on the nearside of the (New) London to Guildford railway line to the southeast – directly west of Oxshott.  On the southern border is the historic village, Stoke D'Abernon, part of the small post town, which gives its name to the railway station between the two areas on the line mentioned: Cobham & Stoke D'Abernon.

Other
Soil
The village neighbourhoods of Downside (south) and Fairmile (east) are on slowly permeable, seasonally wet, slightly acid but base-rich loamy and clayey soil. The longstanding built-up areas resemble the adjacent fertile east banks of the Mole such as at landscape garden Painshill Park on free-draining gravel topped with layers of alluvium.  This contrasts with the steep west bank, acidic sandy heath, which underlies the highest land on all the outskirts, residual outcrops of the Bagshot Sands (Formation). These isolate Cobham village historically, Esher Commons, Oxshott Heath and Woods and the Redhill Common part of Ockham and Wisley Commons.

Elevation
Watershed points, or in international terms drainage divides, are at the summits of the sides of the lower Mole Valley, attaining  and  towards the east close to Oxshott and Stoke D'Abernon respectively.

The River Mole runs through Cobham, with a visitor area and well-surfaced path by the mill in the High Street, dividing the low-rise urban village/town centre from the remaining agricultural parts of Cobham in the west and south. This can flood small, old parts of the village centre in extreme rainfall.

Demography
Cobham used to have two wards; the Cobham Fairmile ward has a population of 4,760 neighbouring Cobham and Downside has a population of 6,158. Cobham Fairmile ward has been abolished and is now part of the Oxshott and Stoke d’Abernon Ward.

Neighbouring places

Landmarks

At the heart of Cobham is the Church Cobham Conservation Area, which was designated in 1973 and includes fourteen statutory listed buildings.  Amongst these are Pyports, once the home of Vernon Lushington; the picturesque Church Stile House; and two fine houses overlooking the River Mole: Ham Manor and Cedar House, the latter owned by the National Trust.

Across the river from the church into Downside village, the estate of Cobham Park was the home of John Ligonier, 1st Earl Ligonier, who was made Commander-in-Chief of the army in 1757. In 1806 Cobham Park was bought by Harvey Christian Combe a brewer and Lord Mayor of London.  The present house was completed in 1873 by his nephew, Charles Combe, to a design by Edward Middleton Barry: it has now been divided into apartments.  At the other end of the village, beside the A3, Painshill Park is a fine 18th-century landscape garden, restored from dereliction since 1980.  Painshill House dates from the 18th century and has also been divided into apartments.

Two other large houses on the outskirts of Cobham have been taken over by schools:  Heywood is now the American Community School, and Burwood House is now Notre Dame School.

Chelsea F.C.'s training ground is nearby, close to Cobham and Stoke d'Abernon railway station and some of its more deluxe private homes belong to Chelsea's players. The Fairmile or eastern part of the parish has a high proportions of mansions and gated roads.

Cobham Mill

The River Mole provides a setting for the red brick water mill, constructed Late 18C and once part of a much larger complex. It stands on the site of earlier mills dating back to the Middle Ages. The mill was in use until 1928, when it became uneconomical to continue operating.  Thereafter it was used as a storehouse.

During World War II, a Canadian tank collided with the main building, causing much damage.

In 1953 the main part of the mill was demolished by Surrey County Council to alleviate traffic congestion on Mill Road. This left just the grist mill standing.

In 1973 the Cobham Conservation Group was formed, later to become the Cobham Conservation and Heritage Trust, and one of its main objectives was to rescue the much deteriorated grist mill building from sliding into the river as a result of water erosion of the mill island. In 1986 the freehold of the mill was taken over by the Thames Water Authority who, as part of their flood control expenditure rebuilt the weirs nearby.  They also recognised that the mill was Grade II listed and shored up the mill's foundations.

Thereafter, the Cobham Mill Preservation Trust was formed as a sister organisation to the Cobham Conservation Group and took over the leasehold. The building was restored to full working order by the volunteers of the Cobham Mill Preservation Trust, and first opened to the public in 1993. Cobham Mill is now open to the public from 2 pm to 5 pm on the second Sunday of each month between April and October, inclusive.

Education
St Andrew's Primary School is located in the village as is Cobham Free School which is an all-through school. A local prep school is Feltonfleet School. There are three independent schools: Notre Dame; ACS (The American Community Schools) Cobham International and Reed's School.

Local leisure and entertainment
Painshill Park is nearby and Silvermere golf course is located in Redhill Road on the north side of the A3. Cobham has four football clubs: Cobham F.C., Mole Valley SCR F.C., Cobham United Football Club and Cobham Town FC (formed 2007). Cobham also has a cricket club, Cobham Avorians, formed in 1928.  Avorians was named after its founder, local landowner Edward James Avory, and originally played at the Fairmile Estate before re-locating to Convent Lane on the Burwood Estate in 1948.  Cobham Rugby Football Club has four teams which play regularly, as well as youth and mini sections. There is Cobham Village Club and a branch of the Royal British Legion. Cobham Players regularly present plays, musicals, pantomimes and other entertainments in Cobham.

Walton Firs Activity Centre lies just off the A3 in Cobham and covers 28 acres.  It takes its name from Colonel Walton, who dealt with the purchase of the site in 1939.  It was used by a Royal Artillery Anti-Aircraft Battery during World War II and in peacetime returned to use as a Scout camp site.  During the 1990s some 3,000 additional trees were planted, and more recently an all-weather barn and an artificial, but realistic, caving complex have been added.

Politics

Parliament and Local 
The Member of Parliament (MP) is Conservative Dominic Raab in the Esher and Walton constituency. Raab succeeded Ian Taylor who stood down at the 2010 General Election. In local government Cobham is part of Elmbridge Borough Council and Surrey County Council.  Until 2016, Cobham was divided into two wards, Cobham Fairmile and Cobham & Downside for Elmbridge voting. Following boundary changes in 2016, Cobham was divided between a newly drawn Cobham and downside ward and an expanded Oxshott & Stoke d’Abernon ward, with the Fairmile name disappearing. There are six councillors covering the two new wards, all Conservative. Cobham councillor James Browne was Leader of Elmbridge Borough Council in 2019. For Surrey County voting, Cobham is paired with Stoke d'Abernon.

Cobham has many old buildings, conservation areas and housing development pressures.  It has a very active Heritage Trust, re-formed in 2007, and a lower-profile Residents Association. Unlike neighbouring areas in Elmbridge, Residents and amenity groups do not contest local elections in Cobham; occasionally independents have stood, such as in a 2007 by-election.  The only non-Conservative elected was a Liberal/Focus councillor, Mike King in 1984 in the Fairmile ward, which includes some high density social and private housing beside the A3, as well upmarket private estates. Cobham and Downside ward includes the village centre, private estates off the A245 Stoke Road, semi-rural Downside and Hatchford, Ockham south of the M25.

Since the 2013 Surrey County election, the local Member for Cobham is Conservative, Mrs Mary Lewis who serves as Cabinet member for Children, Young People and Families. A Cobham & Downside member on Elmbridge, Mike Bennison since 2005 also represents the next 3 stops up the line to London Oxshott Claygate and Hinchley Wood on Surrey County Council.

British Army 
Following the formation of the Territorial Force in 1908, the town, for recruiting, was granted to the 6th Battalion, The East Surrey Regiment which maintained a platoon from A Company.  The town also maintained the "Sandyroyd School Troops of Scouts".

Road and rail links
To the north and west of the town is the A3 trunk road, a major arterial route from London to Portsmouth. This road links to the M25 motorway at Junction 10, immediately to the southwest of Cobham.
 The A307, Portsmouth Road starts in Cobham and runs northwards to the adjoining town of Esher. This is also known as the "old A3".
 The A245 runs through the centre of the town and leads to Leatherhead in the south-east and Byfleet to the west.

Cobham & Stoke d'Abernon railway station, opened in 1885, is on the New Guildford line from London Waterloo.

Police and fire services
The closest public desk and offices of Surrey Police is at the Civic Offices, Elmbridge Borough Council, in Esher.
 Surrey Fire & Rescue Service, called Painshill Fire Station, has a full-time crew together with:
 1 Water Tender Ladder
 1 Incident Command Unit
 1 Forward Command Vehicle

Notable people
John Addison, (1920–1998), composer, was born in Cobham.
Matthew Arnold, (1822–1888), poet, lived in Cobham from 1873 to 1888.
Malcolm Arbuthnot, (1877–1967), pictorialist, photographer and artist, was born in Cobham.
Sir Felix Aylmer, (1889–1979), actor, lived at Painshill House, Cobham in the 1970s.
Antonio Banderas (born 1960), Spanish actor, lives in Cobham
General Sir Thomas Brotherton, (1785–1868), died nearby and is buried in St. Andrew's churchyard.
Harvey Christian Combe, (1752–1818), brewer, Lord Mayor of London, owner of Cobham Park
Aaron Eckhart, (born 1968), American actor, lived in Cobham and attended the American Community School.
Shane Filan, (born 1979), singer, former member of Westlife, has homes in Cobham and Sligo, Ireland.
Kit Hain, (born 1956), singer and songwriter, was born in Cobham
Harold B. Hudson, (1898–1982), World War I flying ace, was born in Cobham.
Nick Jones, (born 1963), entrepreneur, owner of Babington House and husband of Kirsty Young, grew up in Cobham.
Nicholas Lane, (1585–1644), cartographer, came from a Cobham family and his earliest surviving work, 1613, is of Painshill.
John Ligonier, 1st Earl Ligonier, (1680–1770), Commander-in-Chief of the British Army, lived at Cobham Park.
Vernon Lushington, (1832–1912), lawyer and patron to the arts, lived at Pyports in Cobham.
Sir (Albert) Noel Campbell Macklin (1886–1946), of Fairmile estate, a British car maker and boat designer.
Kenneth McAlpine (born 1920), racing driver, was born in Cobham.
Nichola McAuliffe (born 1955), television and stage actress and writer, was born in Cobham.
Admiral Sir Graham Moore, (1764–1843), naval officer, lived at Brook Farm in Cobham and is buried in St. Andrew's churchyard.
General Lord Henry Percy VC KCB, (1817–1877), soldier and MP, was born at Burwood House (now Notre Dame School).
Sir Thomas Sopwith, (1888–1989), aviation pioneer and industrialist who founded the Sopwith Aviation, H G Hawker Engineering, Hawker Aircraft and Hawker Siddeley aircraft companies, lived at Compton House, Cobham in the 1920s.
Fred Stedman, (1870–1918), Surrey county cricketer, was born in Cobham.
Gerrard Winstanley, (1609–1676), reformer, lived in Cobham from 1643 and was churchwarden in 1667–1668.
Louis Cole, British film-maker and YouTube personality.
Mudar Zahran, Jordanian politician and Secretary General of the Jordanian Opposition Coalition.
Sue Biggs , director general of the Royal Horticultural Society.

Demography and housing

The average level of accommodation in the region composed of detached houses was 28%, the average that was apartments was 22.6%.

The proportion of households in the settlement who owned their home outright compares to the regional average of 35.1%.  The proportion who owned their home with a loan compares to the regional average of 32.5%.  The remaining % is made up of rented dwellings (plus a negligible % of households living rent-free).

In film, fiction and the media

The Cobham News & Mail covered local news in the latter part of the 20th century until it closed and was incorporated into the Surrey Advertiser. Cobham is also covered by the Elmbridge Guardian, the Surrey Herald and the Surrey Comet newspapers.

Nearest places
Stoke D'Abernon
Oxshott
Esher
Leatherhead
Hersham
Weybridge
Walton-on-Thames
Effingham
Byfleet
East Horsley
West Horsley
Downside

Notes

References

Bibliography

External links
 Aerial photographs of Cobham
 Cobham Conservation and Heritage Trust
 Cobham Mill Preservation Trust
 Official website for Cobham Rugby Football Club
 Official website for Cobham Sports Association incorporating Cobham Rugby, Cobham Tennis and Cobham Cricket
 Cobham Players
 Cobham Avorians Cricket Club
 

Towns in Surrey
Borough of Elmbridge